The University of Calabar is a public university situated in Calabar, Cross River State, Nigeria. It is one of Nigeria's second generation federal universities. The University of Calabar was a campus of the University of Nigeria until 1975. The Vice Chancellor is Florence B. Obi. The post of the DVC (Academic) is held by Angela Oyo Ita, while Grace Eno Nta is the current DVC (Administration).

The architecture was designed by John Elliott. It was established by decree to fulfill this traditional mandate, its motto "Knowledge for Service".

The University of Calabar was one of the foremost Nigerian Universities to automate students' registration processes through the College Portal, and has taken a step further to automate her alumni relations which includes an online transcript request and processing first of its kind in the country.

University Library 
The University of Calabar Library is known as Definitive Library which is an academic library that was established in 1975. the library has seating capacity of 3000 readers, 16 staff offices that supporting teaching, research and community services. the building was planned to house over one million volumes of books with a total of 22,746 square meter floor space.

Administration and leadership 
The current principal members of the university administration and their positions are as follows:

Faculties
The university has the following faculties:

 Faculty of Allied Medical Sciences
 Faculty of Basic Medical Sciences
 Faculty of Dentistry
 Faculty of Medicine
 Faculties of Management Sciences
 Faculty of Education
 Faculty of Social Sciences
 Faculty of Arts
 Institute of Public Policy and Administration
 Faculty of Law
 Faculty of Biological Sciences
 Faculty of Physical Sciences
 Faculty of Engineering and Technology
 Faculty of Environmental Sciences
 Faculty of Pharmacy
 Faculty of Agriculture, forestry and Wildlife Management
 Institute of Oceanography
 Bassey Andah Institute for African and Asian Studies
 Graduate School
 University of Calabar Consultancy Services

Affiliate institutions
This is a list of affiliate institutions of the University of Calabar approved by the National Universities Commission (NUC).
 Nigerian Christian Bible Church (NCBC).
 Reformed Theological Seminary, Mkar (RTSM).
 Catholic Institute of West Africa, Port-Harcourt (CIWAP).
 Essien Ukpabio Presbyterian College Itu, Akwa Ibom State (EUPCIAS).
 College of Education, Katsina-Ala, Benue State (CEKBS).
 Federal College of Education, Obudu, Cross River State (FCEOCR).

Notable alumni
Amongst the alumni of the University of Calabar are:
 
 
Reuben Abati, Lawyer/writer.
Queeneth Agbor, actress
Biko Agozino, criminologist
Godswill Akpabio, former governor of Akwa Ibom State 
Anthony Ayine, auditor general for the Federation.
Regina Askia-Williams actress -left before graduation
Isabella Ayuk, MBGN 2012.
Grace Folashade Bent, politician.
Omotu Bissong, model/television presenter.
Stacey B. Day, Ntufam Ajan of Oban 
Chile Eboe-Osuji, International Jurist and Current President of the International Criminal Court, The Hague, Netherlands.
Dr. Betta Edu, Nigerian public health specialist and politician
Keppy Ekpenyong, Nigerian actor.
Alexx Ekubo, actor/model.
Ita Enang, politician
Nelson Enwerem, model, television personality and winner of Mr Nigeria 2018
Eve Esin, Nigerian actress
Eno Essien, technology entrepreneur
Aloysius Akpan Etok, politician
Kate Henshaw, actress
Okezie Ikpeazu, Current Governor of Abia State of Nigeria.
Alex Mascot Ikwechegh, politician, businessman and philanthropist
 Stella Immanuel, Doctor and conspiracy theorist based in Houston, Texas.
Iyanya, singer/songwriter/performer.
Osita Izunaso, politician
Uche Jombo, actress
Benjamin Kalu, politician and member of the House of Representatives
 Yahaya Kuta, Nigerian author
Victor Ndoma-Egba, politician
 Aniebiet Inyang Ntui, EU Ambassador, University Librarian of University of Calabar and Professor of Library and Information Science. 
Florence Obi, academic, author, professor, and 11th substantive vice-chancellor of University of Calabar
John Odey, former minister
Stephanie Okereke, actress.
Chido Onumah, Nigerian/Canadian journalist, author and activist
Wofai Samuel, media personality and communications executive
Jewel Taylor, Former first Lady, Senator(2006-2018) and current Vice President of Liberia
John James Akpan Udo-Edehe, politician
Owens Wiwa, human rights activist.
Chukwuemeka Ngozichineke Wogu, minister.

Notable faculty
 Eskor Toyo, Professor of Economics and Marxist scholar
 Eno James Ibanga, Professor of Solid State Physics and Materials Science
 Akpan Hogan Ekpo, Professor of Economics and Public Policy

References

External links
University of Calabar website
Unical matters website

 
Universities and colleges in Nigeria
Education in Cross River State
Educational institutions established in 1975
1975 establishments in Nigeria
Public universities in Nigeria